Walter Scott was a Scottish footballer who played in the Scottish League for Heart of Midlothian and Falkirk as a centre half.

Personal life 
Scott served in McCrae's Battalion of the Royal Scots during the First World War.

Honours 
Heart of Midlothian

 Rosebery Charity Cup: 1913–14
 Wilson Cup: 1914–15
 Dunedin Cup: 1914–15
 East of Scotland Shield: 1913–14

Career statistics

References 

Scottish footballers
Scottish Football League players
British Army personnel of World War I
Year of birth missing
Place of death missing
Association football wing halves
McCrae's Battalion
Royal Scots soldiers
Falkirk F.C. players
1975 deaths
Place of birth missing
Association football fullbacks
Heart of Midlothian F.C. players
Raith Rovers F.C. players
St Bernard's F.C. wartime guest players